Funnelweb or funnel-web may refer to:
Funnel-web spider, several different species
FunnelWeb, a literate programming environment
The FunnelWeb spectroscopic survey of southern hemisphere stars, underway at the UK Schmidt Telescope